The Roslyn Grist Mill is located along Old Northern Boulevard in Roslyn, New York, United States. It was built sometime before the mid-18th century and is one of the few surviving Dutch colonial commercial frame buildings in the U.S. Added to the National Register of Historic Places in 1986, it is currently being restored for use as a museum.

Building

The original timber framing, which uses a series of transverse post and beam bents connected by sills and wall plates, differing from the traditional European grid pattern, is now covered in weatherboard. A -story wing is located to the west, above the race. A mill pond, incorporated into the Roslyn Village Historic District unlike the actual mill itself, is to the north, its outlet eventually feeding into Long Island Sound.

A hook-and-pulley double plank door is located in the center of the attic. Windows are irregularly located since many have been either added over time or boarded over. Some of the original milling equipment, mainly gears was still located inside as of 1986.

History

A gristmill has existed on the site since the first decade of the 18th century, when John Robeson built on it. He in turn sold it to Jeremiah Williams, who is believed to have built the current mill sometime between 1715 and 1741. After another owner, it became the property of Hendrick Onderdonk, who already operated two paper mills in the settlement then known as Hempstead Harbor, in 1758.

He ran the mill profitably, and hosted George Washington, who mentions the mill in his diary, on a 1790 visit to the area. The Onderdonk family sold it in 1801 to Daniel Hoogland and Abraham Coles. They sold in 1849 to Joseph Hicks, whose family continued to operate it as a mill until 1916, when they converted it into a tea house and museum. That use continued until 1975, when the Nassau County parks department took it over.

21st-century restoration
During the county's ownership, the building remained vacant. No use or new tenant could be found, and it continued to deteriorate.

In the 2000s, Roslyn citizens got the county to begin restoration efforts that are eventually expected to cost $2 million, funded by the county, village, and matching contributions from the community. As part of the project, the mill will be brought back up to street level. When the work is complete, the county will transfer title to the village, which will let the Roslyn Landmark Society operate it as a museum of the water-powered industries like Onderdonk's that once were so numerous in the village.

In 2020 during the restoration, a time capsule was found embedded in concrete that dated to an earlier restoration in 1917. George Gorski, a Woodbury-based carpenter working on converting the mill into a museum, unearthed a half-pint milk bottle from the Alex Campbell Milk Co., a defunct Long Island distributor. Inside were four coins, a Civil War Army & Navy token (Da.1863), an Indian head penny (Da.1881), a Haitian 20 centimes (Da.1863) and an Indian head penny (Da.1905). There were two letters, one in English that was barely legible and one in Italian by an Artisan, Romolo Caparelli, who was from Pico, Italy. That letter was translated by a Cultural studies professor at Stony Brook University and will be displayed at the mill when the restoration is complete. The other was from a Roslyn builder and descendant of a Hessian soldier who fought in the American Revolution, Steven Speedling, detailing the workers on the earlier restoration.

References

External links

 At historic Roslyn Grist Mill, an unearthed bottle spills out links to the past - YouTube (video) 

Roslyn, New York
Industrial buildings completed in 1741
Watermills in the United States
Grinding mills on the National Register of Historic Places in New York (state)
National Register of Historic Places in North Hempstead (town), New York
Historic American Buildings Survey in New York (state)
Grinding mills in New York (state)
Buildings and structures in Nassau County, New York
Dutch-American culture in New York (state)
Individually listed contributing properties to historic districts on the National Register in New York (state)
Industrial buildings and structures on the National Register of Historic Places in New York (state)
Mill museums in New York (state)
History museums in New York (state)
Industry museums in New York (state)
Mill museums in the United States